Belle Bennett (born Ara Belle Bennett; April 22, 1891 – November 4, 1932), was a stage and screen actress who started her career as a child as a circus performer. She later performed in theater and films.

Early life and career
Bennett was born in Coon Rapids, Iowa, the daughter of Mr. and Mrs. W. B. Bennett. Her father managed a tent-and-wagon show that toured the midwestern United States.

Bennett appeared in circus performances during her childhood. Her father trained her to be a trapeze performer after she spent some years in the Sacred Heart Convent in Minneapolis, Minnesota. By the age of 13 she was appearing in public. Performances with stock companies led Bennett to Broadway, where she appeared in theatrical productions staged by David Belasco.

Motion pictures
Bennett was working as a film actress by 1913, and was cast in numerous one-reel shorts by small east coast film companies. She appeared in minor motion pictures like the western film A Ticket to Red Horse Gulch (Mutual 1914). She starred in several full-length films by the Triangle Film Corporation, including The Lonely Woman (1918). She also appeared in the east coast United States Motion Picture Corporation's film Flesh and Spirit (1922). 

She made the move to Hollywood before Samuel Goldwyn selected her from among seventy-three actresses for the leading role in Stella Dallas (1925). While she was filming the movie, her son, 16-year-old William Howard Macy, died. Macy had posed as Bennett's brother for some time, owing to her fear that her employers might find out her true age. She was actually thirty-four rather than twenty-four, which she had claimed to be. Because of the loss of her son, Bennett became close to her co-stars Lois Moran and Douglas Fairbanks Jr., who were also 16 at the time.  

After playing the mother role in Stella Dallas, Bennett was typecast for the remainder of her film career. She later appeared in Mother Machree (1928), The Battle of the Sexes (1928), The Iron Mask (1929), Courage (1930), Recaptured Love (1930) and The Big Shot (1931).

Marriages
Bennett was married three times. Her first husband was Howard Ralph Macy of La Crosse, Wisconsin. They had a son together, William Howard Macy. Bennett later had two more children.

Jack Oaker, a sailor at the San Pedro, California submarine base, was married to her when she worked with the Triangle Film Corporation, in 1918. 

She later married film director Fred Windemere, who she remained with until her death.

Illness and death

During a break in her film career Bennett performed in vaudeville at a Philadelphia theater. She collapsed on stage and was eventually checked into a hospital in Harrisburg. There she underwent blood transfusions, and was able to continue acting briefly. In September 1932, she was rushed by plane from New York following a relapse of cancer, from which she had been suffering for two-and-a-half years. 

She died that November at the age of 41, at Cedars of Lebanon Hospital in Los Angeles, California. Late in her life, Bennett came to believe in the power of prayer. A practitioner of Christian Science influenced her. She is interred in the Valhalla Memorial Park Cemetery in North Hollywood.

Hollywood Walk of Fame
Bennett was posthumously inducted into the Hollywood Walk of Fame during the initial ceremonies in 1960. She received a motion pictures star which is located at 1511 Vine Street.

Partial filmography

Who Is the Savage? (1913)
Through the Sluice Gates (1913)
A Ticket to Red Horse Gulch (1914)
 Mrs. Wiggs of the Cabbage Patch (1914)
Mignon (1915)
Fires of Rebellion (1917)
The Devil Dodger (1917)
 The Fuel of Life (1917)
 The Charmer (1917)
 Bond of Fear (1917)
Ashes of Hope (1917)
 Because of a Woman (1917)
The Last Rebel (1918) 
The Lonely Woman (1918)
The Atom (1918)
Reckoning Day (1918)
The Mayor of Filbert (1919)
Your Best Friend (1922)
 Flesh and Spirit (1922)
Hello, 'Frisco (1924)
His Supreme Moment (1925)
Playing with Souls (1925)
If Marriage Fails (1925)
Stella Dallas (1925)
East Lynne (1925)
The Lily (1926)
Fourth Commandment (1926)
The Way of All Flesh (1927)
Wild Geese (1927)
The Devil's Skipper (1928)
 The Power of Silence (1928)
Mother Machree (1928)
The Sporting Age (1928)
The Battle of the Sexes (1928)
The Iron Mask (1929)
Their Own Desire (1929)
My Lady's Past (1929)
Molly and Me (1929)
Courage (1930)
Recaptured Love (1930)
The Big Shot (1931)

References

 Los Angeles Times, Found Unconscious, July 25, 1918, p. I10.
 Los Angeles Times, Death Takes Star of Stella Dallas, November 5, 1932, p. A1.
 Ankerich, Michael G. Broken Silence: Conversations With 23 Silent Film Stars. McFarland & Company, Inc., Jefferson, NC. 1993. p. 215

Further reading

External links

Belle Bennett profile, virtual-history.com

1891 births
1932 deaths
American silent film actresses
American stage actresses
Western (genre) film actresses
Vaudeville performers
Deaths from cancer in California
20th-century American actresses
Burials at Valhalla Memorial Park Cemetery
American Christian Scientists